Leppäkorpi is a sparsely populated rural village in the municipality of Lohja, Finland. The village contains a workers' hall, a shop, a day-care, and a bus stop.
The river Pitkiönjoki runs through the village. The lake Iso-Palmottu is a small lake near the edges of the village.  The Finnish company Akiro Oy is based in Leppäkorpi.

References 

Lohja
Villages in Finland